Tomás Jofresa Prats (born 25 January 1970) is a Spanish basketball player. He competed in the men's tournament at the 1992 Summer Olympics with Spain. During his 16-year long career, he played mainly in Spain, with stints in Italy, Greece and Portugal.

His brother, Rafa, was also a professional basketball player. Both brothers played together at the 1992 Olympics and were teammates at Joventut Badalona.

References

1970 births
Living people
Baloncesto Málaga players
Basketball players at the 1992 Summer Olympics
CB Girona players
CB Granada players
Gijón Baloncesto players
Joventut Badalona players
Liga ACB players
Olympic basketball players of Spain
Pallacanestro Treviso players
Panellinios B.C. players
S.L. Benfica basketball players
Spanish men's basketball players
Basketball players from Barcelona